Jeff Unaegbu (born Elochukwu Jephthah Unaegbu on October 1, 1979) is a Nigerian writer, actor, artist and documentary film maker, the author of eight books.

Life and career

Early years
Unaegbu was born in Amankwo-Inyi village, Oji River LGA of Enugu State, Nigeria, the first child of five surviving children to Mr. John Ejike Unaegbu and Mrs. Cecilia Enonanma Unaegbu. He attended the Government Secondary School, Minna in 1990, studying sciences and graduated in 1996.  He then attended Muhanatu Computer Institute, graduating in 2000 with distinctions in Certificate and Diploma in Computer Data Processing.  He then attended the University of Nigeria, Nsukka from 2002 to 2006, graduating with second class in Mass Communication. As a student, Unaegbu served as the Editor of the university's Roar Magazine. He also won faculty and poetry prizes.

Career
Unaegbu became an executive officer of the Lagos State Council of Tradesmen and Artisans in the Ministry of Commerce at Alausa, Ikeja.  Based upon his experiences, he wrote his first book, This Lagos Na Wa (Ode on Lagos) and Other Poetic Portraits which was published in January 2006 by Prize Publishers. It is 700 lines long, with 668 lines in iambic pentameter, with rhyme scheme ABABCDCD.  The book was later said to contain a poem that was reviewed as "The longest poem by a Nigerian" in Nigeria's Newswatch magazine on April 2, page 57, 2007.  Another magazine, The Roar, declared that it is, "the longest metrical poem in Africa". In 2010, a new edition of the book of poems was published, with an audio CD of the poems. Its new title was Ode on Lagos (This Lagos Na Wa) and Other Poetic Portraits.

While awaiting his undergraduate final year results, Unaegbu wrote his second book, the first-ever history of the Students’ Union Government of the University of Nigeria, Nsukka from 1960 to 2004, Freedom in Our Bones. The book was published the same month Jeff was posted to Bayelsa State for his National Youth Service Corps Programme, March 2007. The book won the 3rd position in the 2008 Nigerian Universities Research and Development Fair organized by the NUC.  This award helped the University of Nigeria to achieve the second position overall during the Fair.

While serving at Otu-oke in Ogbia LGA of Bayelsa State, Unaegbu began work on the Origins of the NYSC and wrote a biography of the Professor Emeritus of Physics, Alexander Obiefoka Enukora Animalu, co-authored with Dr. Godfrey Akpojotor.  The former Nigerian Minister of Science and Technology, Professor Bartholomew Nnaji, remarked in his review of the book, that it described lucidly, life in Lagos in the late 1950s, especially the budding crime level.

In 2009, Unaegbu co-authored with Emmanuel Ibuot, The Secret Principles of Female Powers.  Also in 2009, he co-authored with Professor Emeritus Alexander Animalu, Professor Umezinwa and Professor Grace Achufusi, Nelson Mandela and Barack Obama African World Challenge Art and Science in the Reconstruction of the Consciousness of Africans in the 21st Century, A Dialogue on Western and African Worldviews.  Unaegbu's Origins of the NYSC was also published in 2009.  In mid 2010, Unaegbu edited and published with Professor Emeka Otagburuagu and N.C. Ohia, The Youth and National Development in Nigeria. He also published his first book of short stories, This Mosquito in Your Net.

In March 2011, Jeff Unaegbu became a contributing writer to NollywoodGossip, an Online Magazine. With Lawrence Onuzulike, another Nigerian Writer and actor, Jeff Unaegbu was also part of the development of a new website that is targeted at creating a platform for Nigerian writers to share thoughts together in the Nigerian literary, academic and art societies. In April 2011, Jeff Unaegbu's story, "Prey" was among the eight stories shortlisted out of 151 entries from sixteen countries in the inaugural edition of the Online African Writing Prize for Flash Fiction. In early November 2011, his book, Ode on Lagos, was shortlisted and got the third position in the annual Association of Nigerian Authors competitions under the ANA/Cadbury Prize ($2000) category. In October, 2012, the book also took second position in Arts/ Humanities (Research) category of the Nigerian Universities Commission-organized Nigerian Universities Research and Development Fair (NURESDEF, 5th Edition.

Work

Filmography
 Saved by Sin, part 2 (2007)
 Saved by Sin, part 3 (2007)
 Zik of Africa- A Historical Reflection (2008/2010)
 Journalism (Flash Documentary) (2010)

Short story collections
 This Mosquito in Your Net, (Nsukka: Global Publishers). (2010)

Nonfiction
 Freedom in Our Bones: THE HISTORY OF THE STUDENTS’ UNION GOVERNMENT, UNIVERSITY OF NIGERIA, NSUKKA (1960-2004), (Onitsha: Blue Publishers, 2007, 2008). (512 Pages) .
 The Origins of the NYSC, (Nsukka: Global Publishers, 2009). (90 Pages) .
 ALEXANDER O.E. ANIMALU: A Biography of the Distinguished Professor of Physics (Co-authored with Dr. Akpojotor, G.E.) (Abuja: Ucheakonam Foundation (Nig.) Ltd., 2008). (133 Pages) .
 Nelson Mandela and Barack Obama African World Challenge: Arts and Science in the Reconstruction of the Consciousness of Africans in the 21st Century, A Dialogue of Western and African Worldviews, (Co-authored with Professors Animalu, A.O.E.; Umezinwa, W.A. and Achufusi, G.) (Enugu: Snaap Publishers, 2009). (102 Pages) .
 The Youth and National Development in Nigeria (Co-edited with Otagburuagu, E.J. and Ohia, N.C. (Nsukka: Global Publishers/ Benak Ventures) (2010) .

See also
 List of Nigerian film producers

References 

University of Nigeria alumni
Filmmakers from Enugu
Nigerian documentary filmmakers
Living people
1979 births
Nigerian film directors
Nigerian cinematographers
Nigerian male film actors
Nigerian writers
Actors from Enugu State
Igbo actors
People from Enugu State
Nigerian male poets
21st-century Nigerian actors
21st-century Nigerian poets